Karl Adams (1811 in Merscheid – 14 November 1849, in Winterthur) was a Swiss mathematician and teacher who specialised in synthetic geometry.

Publications
 Lehre von den Transversalen, 1843
 Die harmonischen Verhältnisse, 1845
 Die merkwürdigen Eigenschaften des geradlinigen Dreiecks, 1846
 Das Malfattische Problem, 1846 and 1848, on the Malfatti circles
 Geometrische Aufgaben mit besonderer Rücksicht auf geometrische ConstruCtion, 1847 and 1849

Sources
 Allgemeine Deutsche Biographie – online version at Wikisource

19th-century Swiss mathematicians
Swiss schoolteachers
Swiss Calvinist and Reformed Christians
1811 births
1849 deaths
19th-century Swiss educators